Wathen is a surname, and may refer to:

 Arthur Wathen (1841–1937), English cricketer
Sir Charles Wathen Kt. (1833 - 1893) Wool Merchant, Clothier & six times Mayor of Bristol.
 Daniel Wathen, American lawyer and politician
 George Wathen (actor) (1762–1849), English actor, stage manager and theatre owner
 Heini Wathén (born 1955), Finnish model
 Jonathan Wathen (surgeon) (c.1728 – 1808), English surgeon
 Jonathan Wathen-Waller (1769–1853), English eye surgeon
 Richard Wathen (born 1971), British painter
 Richard B. Wathen (1917–2001), American politician, journalist, and author
 George Henry Wathen (1816–1879), geologist and South African politician 
 Samuel Wathen (c.1720 – 1787), English physician